Hemilienardia balteata is a species of sea snail, a marine gastropod mollusk in the family Raphitomidae.

Description
(Original description) The shell is fusiformly ovate and longitudinally coarsely ribbed. The ribs are disposed alternately on the whorls, crossed by transverse raised striae. The whorls are roundly angulated at the sutures. The outer lip is incurved, serrated on its edge by the termination of the transverse striae. The colour is light brown, ornamented by one white band on centre of each whorl.

Distribution
This marine species is endemic to Hawaii

References

 Wiedrick S.G. (2017). Aberrant geomorphological affinities in four conoidean gastropod genera, Clathurella Carpenter, 1857 (Clathurellidae), Lienardia Jousseaume, 1884 (Clathurellidae), Etrema Hedley, 1918 (Clathurellidae) and Hemilienardia Boettger, 1895 (Raphitomidae), with the description of fourteen new Hemilienardia species from the Indo-Pacific. The Festivus. special issue: 2-45.

External links
 

balteata
Gastropods described in 1860